Josip Vrlić (born 25 April 1986) is a Croatian professional water polo player. He was part of the Brazilian team at the 2015 World Aquatics Championships and 2016 Summer Olympics. He won a silver medal at the 2015 Pan American Games.

His younger brother Mislav is also water polo player, playing for VK Primorje from Rijeka. He is the heaviest water polo player and cited as "one of the strongest water polo players in the world."

As of July 2019, it is revealed Vrlić has transferred to HAVK Mladost from Barceloneta, water polo club from Zagreb for which he will be playing in upcoming months.

Honours

Club
Jug Dubrovnik 
LEN Champions League:2015–16 ;runners-up: 2016–17
LEN Super Cup: 2016
Croatian Championship:  2015–16, 2016–17
Adriatic League: 2015–16, 2016–17
Atlètic-Barceloneta
Spanish Championship: 2010–11,  2011–12, 2012–13, 2017–18, 2018–19   
Copa del Rey: 2010, 2013, 2018, 2019
Supercopa de España: 2018, 2019
Botafogo
Brazilian Championship: 2013–14 
 Mladost
Croatian Championship:  2020–21
Croatian Cup: 2020–21
Radnički Kragujevac
Serbian Cup: 2014–15, 2021–22

Awards
Member of the World Team 2019, 2022 by total-waterpolo

See also
 List of World Aquatics Championships medalists in water polo

References

External links

 

Brazilian male water polo players
Croatian male water polo players
Living people
Sportspeople from Rijeka
1986 births
Pan American Games medalists in water polo
Pan American Games silver medalists for Brazil
Water polo players at the 2015 Pan American Games
Olympic water polo players of Brazil
Water polo players at the 2016 Summer Olympics
Expatriate water polo players
World Aquatics Championships medalists in water polo
Medalists at the 2015 Pan American Games
Water polo players at the 2020 Summer Olympics
Olympic water polo players of Croatia